Elchanan Halpern (December 26, 1921 – February 18, 2015) was the Rabbi of the Golders Green neighbourhood of London and President of the Union of Orthodox Hebrew Congregations. He was also known as the Av Beit Din of Radomishl after the town of his maternal grandfather, Rabbi , Rav of Radomishl.

He was born in Košice, Czechoslovakia. Both of his parents were descendants of Rabbi Chaim Halberstam.

In his youth, he studied several years under his grandfather, Rabbi Shmuel Engel, until the death of the latter, who was formally eulogised by Halpern, then aged 13. At age 14, Halpern corresponded with Rabbi Joseph Rosen.

After his marriage, he settled in London.

At the time of Halpern's death, He was considered one of the most senior rabbis in the world. He left behind over 1,400 direct descendants, including grandchildren, great-grandchildren, and great-great-grandchildren. His five sons and four sons-in-law all hold important rabbinic positions.

References 

1921 births
2015 deaths
Clergy from Košice
Czechoslovak Jews
People from Golders Green
Rabbis from London